Laurence Criner occasionally credited as J. Lawrence Criner, was an actor in the United States. An African-American, he had numerous film roles including as the male lead and star.

He was a member of the Lafayette Players and worked at Norman Studios in Jacksonville, Florida where he starred in two of their race films. He later worked at African American studio Million Dollar Productions

The Smithsonian Institution has a lobby card for The Flying Ace. The Library of Congress has a movie poster of Life Goes On that features an insetimage of Criner. The National Museum of African American History has a herald for Flying Ace.

Theater
Meek Mose (1928), credited as J. Lawrence Criner

Filmography
The Flying Ace (1926) as Capt. Blly Stokes
The Millionaire (1927 film)
Black Gold (1928 film)
Black Moon (1934), as high priest Kala
Bargain with Bullets (1937)
The Duke Is Tops (1938) as Doc Dorando
Gang Smashers
Life Goes On (1938 film) 
Midnight Shadow (1939) Prince Alihabad
Four Shall Die (1940) as Roger Fielding 
Gang War (1940 film)
The Gang's All Here (1941 film) as Ham Shanks
Up Jumped the Devil (1941) as Sheriff
King of the Zombies (1941) as Dr. Couillie 
Freckles Comes Home (1942) as Roxbury B. Brown, III
Law of the Jungle (film) (1942) as Chief Mojobo an Oxford graduate
Miracle in Harlem (1948), as Albert Marshall
What a Guy
The Jackie Robinson Story

References

External links
Findagrave entry

Year of birth missing
Year of death missing
African-American male actors
American male film actors
American male stage actors
20th-century American male actors
20th-century African-American people